Frederick Harwood (1 June 1827 – 11 December 1887) was an English cricketer. Harwood was a right-handed batsman who bowled right-arm roundarm fast. He was born and died at Mitcham, Surrey.

Harwood made his first-class debut for Surrey against Middlesex in 1851 at The Oval. His next appearance in first-class cricket came fourteen years later in 1865 when he made three appearances for Surrey against Nottinghamshire, Sussex and Kent. In his four first-class matches, Harwood took a total of 7 wickets at an average of 22.57, with beat figures of 3/39. With the bat, he scored 8 runs with a highest of 5.

References

External links
Frederick Harwood at ESPNcricinfo
Frederick Harwood at CricketArchive

1827 births
1887 deaths
People from Mitcham
English cricketers
Surrey cricketers